Ratcliffe or Ratcliff may refer to:

Places

United Kingdom
 Ratcliff or Ratcliffe, former hamlet, Tower Hamlets, London
 Ratcliffe-on-Soar, a village in Nottinghamshire
 Ratcliffe on the Wreake, a village in Leicestershire
 Ratcliffe College, a school in Leicestershire
 Ratcliffe Culey, a village in Leicestershire

United States
 Ratcliff, Arkansas, a city

People
 Arthur Ratcliffe (1882–1963), British Conservative Member of Parliament for Leek 1931–1935
 Derek Ratcliffe (1929–2005), British ecologist
 Don Ratcliffe (1934–2014), English footballer
 Francis Ratcliffe (1904–1970), Australian zoologist
 Henry Butler Ratcliffe (1845–1929), British Conservative Member of Parliament for Bradford Central 1918–1922
 J. A. Ratcliffe (1902–1987), British ionospheric physicist and academic
 Jack Ratcliffe (footballer) (1880–1948), English footballer
 Jim Ratcliffe (born 1952), British billionaire, chemical engineer and financier
 Jo Ratcliffe, British artist
 John Ratcliffe (governor) (1549–1609), governor of the original Jamestown, Virginia, US
 John Ratcliff (cricketer) (1848–1925), English cricketer
 John Ratcliffe (American politician) (born 1965), US Congressman from Texas, Director of National Intelligence
 John W. Ratcliff (born 1961), computer game developer
 Jordan Ratcliffe, English teenager who went missing in 2008
 Kevin Ratcliffe, (born 1960) Welsh footballer
 Mary Curtis Ratcliff (born 1942), American artist
 Mildred Ratcliffe (1899–1988), English painter, commercial artist and calligrapher
 Paddy Ratcliffe (1919–1986), Irish footballer
 Peter J. Ratcliffe (born 1954), physician-scientist
 Richard Ratcliffe, husband of the Iranian-British detainee Nazanin Zaghari-Ratcliffe
 Richard Ratcliffe (died 1485), English nobleman
 Richard Ratcliffe (1751–1825), American public official considered to be the founder of the city of Fairfax, Virginia, in 1805
 Sandy Ratcliff (1948–2019), English actress
 Simon Ratcliffe, of house music duo Basement Jaxx

Fiction
 Governor Ratcliffe (Disney), a fictionalized representation in the animated film Pocahontas of John Ratcliffe of the Jamestown colony

See also
 Radcliffe (disambiguation)
 Nazanin Zaghari-Ratcliffe (born 1978), detainee in Iran 

English-language surnames